Lucerne, Ohio may refer to:

Lucerne, Columbiana County, Ohio, a ghost town
Lucerne, Knox County, Ohio, an unincorporated community